Kon' (Horse) is a popular Russian song, first performed by the pop band Lyube in 1994. The music was written by Igor Matvienko, and the lyrics by his long-time co-author Alexander Shaganov.

The song is extremely popular, performed by many artists, and has acquired the status of a quasi-"folk" song, performed at family events.

History 
According to Matvienko, the song was originally written for another music project that he was producing, Ivanushki International, and only at the last moment the idea came to remake it for Lyube.

The corresponding fragment from the musical film Zona Lyube, which accompanied the album of the same name, functions as the song's music video.

Popularity 
In a sociological study conducted in 2015 by the Russki Reporter magazine, the lyrics of Kon''' came to the 32nd place in the list of the most popular poetic lines in Russia, ahead of the Anthem of the Soviet Union, which achieved the 39th place in the same rating.

The Russian writer Dmitry Sokolov-Mitrich calls the song "Russia's unofficial anthem", writing:

The regent of the choir of the Sretensky Monastery male monastery Nikon Zhila indicates that this is the most popular song from the choir's repertoire among listeners throughout Russia.

Matvienko calls Kon''' the most important song he wrote in his life.

Music 
The song begins unaccompanied, a capella, in folk traditions, in which the lead singer begins the chanting. The male choir is joining gradually, as if from a distance. The third verse is an octave higher, intensifying the performance and overwhelming the emotions, and the final phrase, in the best traditions of the genre, leaves room for reflection, and a sort of incompleteness.

Lyrics 
The words of the song use archetypal motives of Russian lyrical poetry. For example, the line "there is grace in the night stars" (Ночью в поле звёзд благодать) corresponds to "grace of flying stars" (летающих звёзд благодать) from Sergei Yesenin's poem “Leaves are falling, leaves are falling...”.

Sokolov-Mitrich especially notes the verse saying "let me go out and seek where does the field give birth to the dawn" (Дай-ка я пойду посмотрю, / Где рождает поле зарю): "There it is, the 'national idea'. Unheard of simplicity. Get to the horizon. Going towards the sun forever in the naïve hope of catching it. The mission is stupid and at the same time great. Because it doesn’t matter whether that place exists or not. It is important that for this nation there is an endless task source. Go, ride, race towards the emerging light, to the East. There, where everything starts and nothing dies. Where does the new day come from, a new world, a new life".

References 

Horses in culture
Russian-language songs
1994 songs